Cleghornia is a genus of plants in the family Apocynaceae; its various species are distributed in Borneo, China, Laos, Malaysia, Sri Lanka, Thailand, and Vietnam.

The genus name was chosen in dedication to Dr. Hugh Cleghorn,  the "father of scientific forestry in India".

Species
 Cleghornia acuminata Wight - Sri Lanka
 Cleghornia malaccensis (Hook.f.) King & Gamble - Guizhou, Yunnan, Laos, Vietnam, Thailand, W Malaysia

formerly included
 C. borneensis King & Gamble = Anodendron borneense (King & Gamble) D.J.Middleton
 C. chinensis (Merr.) P.T.Li = Sindechites chinensis (Merr.) Markgr. & Tsiang
 C. cymosa Wight = Cleghornia acuminata Wight
 C. dongnaiensis Pierre ex Pit. = Cleghornia malaccensis (Hook.f.) King & Gamble
 C. gracilis King & Gamble = Anodendron gracile (King & Gamble) D.J.Middleton
 C. henryi (Oliv.) P.T.Li = Sindechites henryi Oliv.

References

External links
 Genus account at Flora of China

Apocynaceae genera
Apocyneae